The Rodney Cox myth is an urban legend which purports that a man, whose name is sometimes given as Robert Cox, was personally executed by U.S. President Thomas Jefferson for treason. There is no substantive evidence that Cox existed or that Jefferson personally executed anybody, yet the urban legend has persisted. The rumor seems to originate from the 2001 movie Swordfish, which presents the story.

References 

Urban legends
Cultural depictions of Thomas Jefferson
Capital punishment in the United States
Works about capital punishment